Henri Hooft, also known as Harry Hooft (born May 21, 1969), is a Dutch former kickboxer and trainer. He is the head trainer at Kill Cliff FC and formerly the Blackzilians.

Career 
Hooft was born and raised in The Hague, Netherlands. At the age of 15, he became interested in combat sports. He started training with his brother in full contact Karate, but later switched to kickboxing. He already began competing after training for three months, winning several competitions. At the age of 18, he was invited by Dutch kickboxing world champion Rob Kaman to move to Thailand to train with him. There, he discovered Thai boxing.

Hooft began fighting professionally while coaching at the same time. He developed his own fighting system by combining the best of Thai boxing and Dutch kickboxing. He competed in more than 100 kickboxing fights. His most notable fight was against Stefan Leko at the K-1 Grand Prix '99, which he lost by knockout in the first round. In 2004, he joined Team Aerts as the sparring partner and trainer of three-time K-1 champion Peter Aerts, training out of Kops Gym in Amsterdam under Jan Plas. In 2007, he retired from fighting and continued as a trainer. Among the fighters he trained was kickboxing world champion Tyrone Spong.

In 2011, Hooft joined the mixed martial arts gym the Blackzilians in Florida, after he was brought in by Tyrone Spong to train him. There, he went on to become the head stand-up coach. In 2017, he founded his own gym Combat Club, later rebranded as Kill Cliff FC. Hooft trained top contenders such as Rashad Evans, Vitor Belfort, Anthony Johnson, Michael Johnson, Eddie Alvarez, Kamaru Usman, Jake Shields, Matt Mitrione, Gilbert Burns and Michael Chandler.

In late 2020, Hooft and Greg Jones were suspended for three months after they broke COVID-19 protocols by leaving their hotel rooms while quarantining preceding Bellator 253.

Fight record  

|-
|-  bgcolor="#FFBBBB"
| 2007-02-17 || Loss ||align=left| Gökhan Saki || Gala in Margriethal || Schiedam, Netherlands || KO (Left cross) || 1 || 1:14
|-
|-  bgcolor="#CCFFCC"
| 2005-04-3 || Win ||align=left| Tommy Varga || Leo De Snoo Memorial 2005 || Rotterdam, Netherlands || TKO (retirement) ||  || 
|-
|-  bgcolor="FFBBBB"
| 2003-06-04 || Loss ||align=left| Samir Benazzouz || K-1 World Grand Prix 2003 Preliminary Holland || Zoetermeer, Netherlands || Decision (Majority) || 3 || 3:00
|-
|-  bgcolor="FFBBBB"
| 2000-01-23 || Loss ||align=left| Alexey Ignashov || Day of No Mercy || Rotterdam, Netherlands || Decision || 5 || 3:00
|-
|-  bgcolor="FFBBBB"
| 1999-12-05 || Loss ||align=left| Stefan Leko || K-1 World Grand Prix 1999 || Tokyo, Japan || KO (right back kick) || 1 || 2:37
|-
|-  bgcolor="FFBBBB"
| 1991 || Loss ||align=left| Jan Lomulder||  || Netherlands || KO || 3 || 
|-
| colspan=9 | Legend:

References

External links
Official website
K-1 Profile

1969 births
Living people
Dutch male kickboxers
Heavyweight kickboxers
Kickboxing trainers
Martial arts school founders
Mixed martial arts trainers
Sportspeople from The Hague